Teri Meri Doriyaann is an Indian Hindi-language television drama series on Star Plus and streams digitally on Disney+ Hotstar. Produced by Cockrow Entertainment and Shaika Films, It stars Vijayendra Kumeria, Himanshi Parashar, Tushar Dhembla, Roopam Sharma, Jatin Arora and Prachi Hadaa in the lead roles. It is based on Star Jalsha's show Gaatchora.

Premise
The fate of the three Brar brothers- Angad, Garry, and Veer is intertwined with the three Monga sisters- Sahiba, Seerat, and Keerat. But whose bond will form with whom, the decision lies in the hands of God.

Cast

Main
Vijayendra Kumeria as Angad Singh Brar: Inder and Mandeep’s son; Garry, Veer, Ekam, and Kiara’s cousin, Seerat's ex-fiance, Sahiba's husband.
Himanshi Parashar as Sahiba Kaur Monga Brar: Ajeet and Santosh's middle daughter, Seerat and Keerat's sister, Angad's wife.
Tushar Dhembla as Garry Baweja: Jasleen's son; Kiara's brother; Angad, Veer, Ekam's cousin, Seerat's lover.
Roopam Sharma as Seerat Kaur Monga: Ajeet and Santosh's eldest daughter, Sahiba and Keerat's elder sister, Angad's ex-fiance, Garry's lover.
Jatin Arora as Veer Singh Brar: Jaspal and Gurleen's son; Ekam's brother; Angad, Garry and Kiara's cousin.
Prachi Hadaa as Keerat Kaur Monga: Ajeet and Santosh's youngest daughter, Sahiba and Seerat's younger sister.

Recurring
 Lubna Salim as Santosh Kaur Monga: Ajeet's wife; Sahiba, Seerat and Keerat's mother
 Sagar Saini as Ajeet Monga: Santosh's husband; Sahiba, Seerat, and Keerat's father
 Surendrapal Singh as Akaal Singh Brar - Japjyot's husband; Jasleen, Inder, Prabhjyot, and Jaspal's father; Angad, Garry, Kiara, Veer and Ekam's grandfather
Amardeep Jha as Japjyot Kaur Brar - Akaal's wife; Jasleen, Inder, Prabhjyot, and Jaspal's mother; Angad, Garry, Kiara, Veer and Ekam's grandmother
Avinash Wadhawan as Inderpal Singh Brar: Akaal and Japjyot’s elder son; Jaspal, Prabhjyot and Jasleen’s brother; Mandeep's husband; Angad's father
Anita Kulkarni as Mandeep Kaur Brar: Inder’s wife; Angad’s mother
Vaishnavi Ganatra as Ekam Kaur Brar - Gurleen and Jaspal's daughter, Veer's sister; Angad, Garry, and Kiara’s cousin
Sharhaan Singh as Jaspal Singh Brar - Akaal and Japjyot's son; Inder, Prabhjyot and Jasleen’s brother; Gurleen's husband; Veer and Ekam's father
Anshu Varshney as Gurleen Kaur Brar - Jaspal's wife, Veer and Ekam's mother
Gauri Tonk as Jasleen Kaur Baweja - Akaal and Japjyot's daughter; Jaspal, Prabhjyot and Inder’s sister; Garry and Kiara's mother
Rose Sardana as Kiara Kaur Baweja - Jasleen’s daughter; Garry’s sister; Angad, Veer, and Ekam’s cousin
Neetu Wadhwa as Prabhjyot Kaur Sandhu - Akaal and Japjyot's daughter; Jasleen, Inder and Jaspal's sister & Prince’s mother 
 Sailesh Gulabani as Hansraj Sandhu - Prabhjyot's husband; Rewa's brother & Prince’s father 
 Ruhani Roy as Rewa Sandhu - Hansraj's sister; Prabhjyot's sister-in-law & Prince aunt

Guests
 Amandeep Sidhu as Chandni from Chashni
 Srishti Singh as Roshni from Chashni
 Shiny Doshi as Dhara Pandya from Pandya Store
 Megha Chakraborty as Imlie Rana from Imlie
Ayesha Singh as Sai Joshi from Ghum Hai Kisikey Pyaar Mein
Neil Bhatt as Virat Chavan from Ghum Hai Kisikey Pyaar Mein

Production

Filming
The wedding track of Angad-Sahiba featured various StarPlus characters gracing different wedding ceremonies. Megha Chakraborty from Imlie graced the Mehndi ceremony followed by Amandeep Sidhu, Srishti Singh from Chashni and Ayesha Singh and Neil Bhatt from Ghum Hai Kisikey Pyaar Mein gracing the sangeet ceremony. Shiny Doshi from Pandya Store was part of the Haldi Ceremony celebrations.

On 10 March 2023 around 4:30pm a massive fire broke out on the neighboring set of Ghum Hai Kisikey Pyaar Meiin leaving the set into ashes and it was reported that the fire even reached the Teri Meri Doriyaann set and another neighboring set of Ajooni too.

Release
The first promo was released starring Ghum Hai Kisikey Pyaar Meiin leads Neil Bhatt, Ayesha Singh and Aishwarya Sharma introducing the cast of the show.

A second promo featuring Ghum Hai Kisikey Pyaar Meiin lead Ayesha Singh and Pandya Store actor Kanwar Dhillon promoting the show was released followed by another promo of leads Neil Bhatt and Simran Bhudharup promoting the new show.

Another promo featuring Pranali Rathod from Yeh Rishta Kya Kehlata Hai cheering for Angad-Sahiba and Sudhanshu Pandey from Anupamaa cheering for Angad-Seerat was released days before the premiere.

Reception
The show has been constantly performing well in TRP charts maintaining the slot leader at 7pm slot since it's inception. On week 9 2023 , the high voltage marraige track of Angad and Sahiba made the show to enter into top 10 for the very first time.

References

External Links
Teri Meri Doriyaann on Disney+ Hotstar

2023 Indian television series debuts
StarPlus original programming
Hindi-language television shows
Indian television soap operas
Indian drama television series
Indian romance television series